John Lander may refer to:

John Lander (explorer) (1807–1839), Cornish explorer
John St Helier Lander (1868–1944), British artist
John Lander (rower) (1907–1941), British rower; Olympic gold medalist at the 1928 Summer Olympics
Johnny Lander, footballer
John Lander (Australian footballer) (1918–2002), Australian rules footballer

See also
John Landers (disambiguation)